Marie-Luise Marjan (given name: Marlies Lause, born 9 August 1940) is a German actress.

Marie-Luise Marjan is best known for her role as Helga Beimer in the German Television Series Lindenstraße (created by Hans W. Geißendörfer in 1985). She was the heroine in Wolfgang Petersen's drama  (1973) and has also played in films by Werner Schroeter (Palermo or Wolfsburg, Day of the Idiots) and Rainer Werner Fassbinder (Berlin Alexanderplatz). In the German Version of Murder, She Wrote, Immer wenn sie Krimis liest (1994), she has portrayed a detective, Anita De Winter, like Angela Lansbury. She played herself in the 1995 TV special Entführung aus der Lindenstraße. In Shrek 2 and Shrek 3 Marie-Luise Marjan is the German voice of Queen Lilian (Julie Andrews).

In 2010, she was presented with the Cross of Merit, First class of the Federal Cross of Merit. She studied acting with Eduard Marks at the Hochschule für Musik und Theater Hamburg.

References

External links 

1940 births
Living people
German film actresses
German soap opera actresses
German television actresses
Hochschule für Musik und Theater Hamburg alumni
Commanders Crosses of the Order of Merit of the Federal Republic of Germany
German voice actresses
20th-century German actresses
21st-century German actresses